Cragg Branch (also called Craig Branch) is a stream in Lafayette County in the U.S. state of Missouri.

Cragg Branch derives its name from Robert Craig, original owner of the site.

See also
List of rivers of Missouri

References

Rivers of Lafayette County, Missouri
Rivers of Missouri